Vibhavadi is a district (amphoe) in the west of Surat Thani province, southern Thailand.

Geography
Neighboring districts are (from north clockwise): Tha Chang, Phunphin, Khiri Rat Nikhom, and Ban Ta Khun.

The district is in the hills of the Phuket mountain range, with part of the district being protected in the Khlong Yan Wildlife Sanctuary and the Kaeng Krung National Park.

History
The minor district (king amphoe) was created on 22 April 1992 by splitting off two tambons from Khiri Rat Nikhom district. It is named after Princess Vibhavadi Rangsit, who was killed in 1977 when rebels shot down her helicopter in eastern Surat Thani Province.

On 15 May 2007, all 81 minor districts including this one, were upgraded to full districts on 24 August.

Temples
There are three Buddhist temples in the district, all of the Mahayana branch.
Pho Noi (โพธิ์น้อย)
Aran Ya Ram (อรัญญาราม)
Vibhavadi Wana Ram (วิภาวดีวนาราม)

Administration

Central administration 
Vibhavadi is divided into two sub-districts (tambons), which are further subdivided into 31 administrative villages (mubans).

Local administration 
There are two sub-district administrative organizations (SAO) in the district:
 Takuk Tai consisting of sub-district Takuk Tai.
 Takuk Nuea consisting of sub-district Takuk Nuea.

References

External links
amphoe.com 

Vibhavadi